Kalahrud (also Romanized as Kalahrūd and Kolahrūd; also known as Qal‘eh-i-Rūd and Qal‘ehrūd) is a village in Murcheh Khvort Rural District, in the Central District of Shahin Shahr and Meymeh County, Isfahan Province, Iran. At the 2006 census, its population was 295, in 128 families.

References 

Populated places in Shahin Shahr and Meymeh County